Alexander Gleichmann von Oven Jr. (15 April 1879 – 3 September 1969) was a German rower. He competed in the men's eight event at the 1900 Summer Olympics.

References

External links

1879 births
1969 deaths
German male rowers
Olympic rowers of Germany
Rowers at the 1900 Summer Olympics
Rowers from Hamburg
Coxswains (rowing)